95.3 Hope Radio (DXIC 95.3 MHz) is an FM station owned and operated by Adventist Media. Its studios are located at Salvany St. cor. Mabuhay Rd., General Santos, and its transmitter is located at Alabel. The frequency is formerly owned by Matutum Broadcasting Network.

References

External links
Hope Radio Southern Mindanao FB Page
Hope Channel Southern Mindanao FB Page

Radio stations in General Santos
Radio stations established in 2016
Christian radio stations in the Philippines